Maciré Sylla is a singer and dancer. Born in Conakry, the capital of Guinea, but raised in Tayiré, a village in the north of Conakry.

Author and composer, Maciré sings mainly in Soussou and her style is inspired by Mandingo, Afropop, Funk music. 

She has released five albums yet. 

She sold 200 000 K7 of her first LP "Mariama" in Guinea which made her the "best Guinean female singer of year 1998.

Her song "Perenperen", from the album "Massa", was selected for Putumayo's compilation "African Party" (2008).

Biography

Discography 
 Mariama (1996, Djembé Faré/Misslin)
 Maya Irafama (2001, Djembé Faré/Trace)
 Sarefi (2004, Ethnomad/Arion)
 Massa (2005, Djembé Faré/Nocturne)
 Talitha (2010, Djembé Faré/Disques Office)

References

External links
  Official Website

Living people
Year of birth missing (living people)